The Type 748 Schwedeneck-class multi-purpose ship was a class of multi-purpose ships built for the Wehrtechnische Dienststelle 71 (WTD 71) of the German Navy in Eckernförde and the Marinearsenal Wilhelmshaven. Two units are still in use for the WTD 71.

Development 
As a replacement for the test boats Adolf Bestelmeyer, Friedrich Voge, Rudolf Diesel and Hans Christian Oersted built in the 1940s, three medium test boats, (ship type according to the ship number list) were commissioned from Fr. Lürssen Werft as general contractor. Subcontractors were the Kröger shipyard, the Elsflether shipyard and Nobiskrug. A fourth ship of this class was no longer needed.

The hull is made of steel and divided into nine compartments by eight bulkheads. For better maneuvering, transverse thruster systems with 150 kW each are installed in the fore and aft. The ships are used in a variety of ways and take the required equipment on board in containers. The fixed equipment includes a ship's crane, a swiveling A-frame at the stern, a pinasse and accommodation for embarked test personnel.

The state of Mecklenburg-Western Pomerania bought the Schwedeneck in 2010 and had it converted into a research ship at the Peene shipyard in Wolgast.

Ships of class

Citations 

Auxiliary transport ship classes
Auxiliary ships of Germany
Auxiliary ships of the German Navy